Artificially Speaking is a short film, which premiered at Dances with Films 2009 at the Laemmle Sunset 5, June 6, 2009. It stars Alan Sues, Lou Wagner, Karen Rambo, and an assorted cast.

Premise
Where does artificial fruit flavoring come from? Artificial fruit, of course. Holly Hockenberry owns an artificial fruit farm, maintained by overworked gardener Sparky Schlosser. The farm is caught in the middle of a scandal regarding a case of tainted artificial fruit. Some questionable companies may be involved in a massive cover-up, which has caused the farm's profit to plummet.

Cast
 Alan Sues as Sparky Schlosser
 Karen Rambo as Holly Hockenberry
 Stephanie Silverman as Sandy Steinn
 Lou Wagner as Dr. Lionel Bainbridge
 Mike Ciccolini as Warehouse Guy #1
 Frank Walton as Warehouse Guy #2
 Joe Basile as Phil Scuzzola
 Jason Rockney as JJ Ichuta
 Terry Thistelwaite as Documentarian
 Artificial Fruit as The Innocent Victim

External links
 
 

2009 films
2000s English-language films
2009 short films
2009 comedy films
American comedy short films
2000s American films